Kohel Bolagh may refer to:
 Kohel Bolagh, Almalu
 Kohel Bolagh, Nazarkahrizi